Marcel Capron (26 April 1900 – 26 October 1981) was a French wrestler. He competed in the Greco-Roman featherweight event at the 1924 Summer Olympics.

References

External links
 

1900 births
1981 deaths
Olympic wrestlers of France
Wrestlers at the 1924 Summer Olympics
French male sport wrestlers
Sportspeople from Paris